{{DISPLAYTITLE:Muscarinic acetylcholine receptor M4}}

The muscarinic acetylcholine receptor M4, also known as the cholinergic receptor, muscarinic 4 (CHRM4), is a protein that, in humans, is encoded by the  CHRM4 gene.

Function
M4 muscarinic receptors are coupled to Gi/o heterotrimeric proteins.

They function as inhibitory autoreceptors for acetylcholine. Activation of M4 receptors inhibits acetylcholine release in the striatum. The M2 subtype of acetylcholine receptor functions similarly as an inhibitory autoreceptor to acetylcholine release, albeit functioning actively primarily in the hippocampus and cerebral cortex.

Muscarinic acetylcholine receptors possess a regulatory effect on dopaminergic neurotransmission. Activation of M4 receptors in the striatum inhibit D1-induced locomotor stimulation in mice. M4 receptor-deficient mice exhibit increased locomotor simulation in response to D1 agonists, amphetamine and cocaine. Neurotransmission in the striatum influences extrapyramidal motor control, thus alterations in M4 activity may contribute to conditions such as Parkinson's disease.

Ligands

Orthosteric agonists
 acetylcholine
 carbachol
 oxotremorine

Positive allosteric modulators
 LY-2033298 
 VU-0152100 (ML-108) 
 VU-0152099

Antagonists
 AFDX-384 (mixed M2/M4 antagonist, N-[2-[2-[(Dipropylamino)methyl]-1-piperidinyl]ethyl]-5,6-dihydro-6-oxo-11H-pyrido[2,3-b][1,4]benzodiazepine-11-carboxamide, CAS# 118290-27-0)
 Dicycloverine
 Himbacine
 Mamba toxin 3
 PD-102,807 (3,6a,11,14-Tetrahydro-9-methoxy-2-methyl-(12H)-isoquino[1,2-b]pyrrolo[3,2-f][1,3]benzoxazine-1-carboxylic acid ethyl ester, CAS# 23062-91-1)
 PD-0298029
 Tropicamide - moderate selectivity over other muscarinic subtypes (2-5x approx)
 Diphenhydramine

See also
 Muscarinic acetylcholine receptor

References

Further reading

External links 
 

G protein-coupled receptors
Human proteins
Muscarinic acetylcholine receptors